Michael McGowan may refer to:

 Michael McGowan (footballer) (born 1985), association football player
 Michael McGowan (politician) (born 1940), British Labour Member of the European Parliament, 1984–1999
 Michael McGowan (director) (born 1966), film director and screenwriter
 Mick McGowan (born 1973), darts player
 Mike McGowan, Scottish footballer